Snelling & Minnehaha is a bus rapid transit station on the Metro A Line in Saint Paul, Minnesota.

The station is located at the intersection of Minnehaha Avenue on Snelling Avenue. Both station platforms are located far-side of Minnehaha Avenue.

The station opened June 11, 2016 with the rest of the A Line.

Bus connections
 Route 67 - Minnehaha Avenue - Raymond Station - Franklin Avenue
 Route 84 - Snelling Avenue - Highland Village - Sibley Plaza
Connections to local bus Route 67 can be made on Minnehaha Avenue. Route 84 shares platforms with the A Line.

Notable places nearby
Hamline-Midway, Saint Paul

References

External links 
 Metro Transit: Snelling & Minnehaha Station

Bus stations in Minnesota